Yaw Osei Penxe (born 3 April 1997) is a South African rugby union player currently playing for the  in the Pro14. He usually plays as a winger.

Rugby career

At high school level, Penxe represented Border twice at the premier high schools rugby union tournament in South Africa, the Under-18 Craven Week. He played for a Border Country Districts team at the 2014 tournament held in Middelburg, Mpumalanga and – after a spell playing for Kirkham Grammar School in Lancashire in England as part of a schools exchange programme at the end of 2014 – for the Border team at the 2015 event in Stellenbosch.

After matriculating in Queenstown, Penxe moved to Port Elizabeth to join the  academy. He was amongst a large contingent of youngsters that were included in the  squad for the 2016 Currie Cup qualification series. He helped EP Kings win the match 31–18, their first victory of the season.

After those two Currie Cup appearances, Penxe joined the  team for their 2016 Under-19 Provincial Championship campaign. He scored his first try at this level shortly after half-time in the match, helping his side to a 30–17 victory.

Athletics

At school, Penxe also took part in athletics, competing in events such as the 4 × 100 metres relay and the triple jump at high school and provincial level.

References

South African rugby union players
Living people
Xhosa people
1997 births
People from Queenstown, South Africa
Rugby union wings
Eastern Province Elephants players
Southern Kings players
Sharks (rugby union) players
Sharks (Currie Cup) players
Rugby union players from the Eastern Cape